John Cameron Urschel (born June 24, 1991) is a Canadian-American mathematician, former professional American football guard and center and chess player. He played college football at Penn State and was drafted by the Baltimore Ravens in the fifth round of the 2014 NFL Draft. Urschel played his entire NFL career with Baltimore before announcing his retirement on July 27, 2017, at 26 years old.

Urschel has bachelor's and master's degrees (both from Penn State) and a doctorate (from the Massachusetts Institute of Technology), all in mathematics. He has published peer-reviewed articles in mathematics. Urschel is also an advanced stats columnist for The Players' Tribune. He is currently serving a three-year term on the College Football Playoff selection committee which began in the spring of 2020.

Early life and education
Urschel was born in Winnipeg, Manitoba, Canada. His parents, John Urschel and Venita Parker, were a surgeon and attorney, respectively. He grew up in Buffalo, New York where he graduated from Canisius High School in 2009.

He earned bachelor's (2012) and master's (2013) degrees in mathematics at Pennsylvania State University. While at Penn State, he was awarded the William V. Campbell Trophy, known as the "academic Heisman".

Professional football career
John Urschel was a player for the Baltimore Ravens. His career lasted from 2014 to 2017.

2014 NFL Draft

Urschel was selected by the Baltimore Ravens in the fifth round of the 2014 NFL draft with the 175th overall pick. He played in 11 games, starting three, for the Ravens in 2014. He appeared in 16 games, starting seven, for the team in 2015.

Retirement
On July 27, 2017, Urschel announced his retirement from the NFL after three seasons. The Baltimore Sun reported that the JAMA study on the prevalence of chronic traumatic encephalopathy in deceased players was a factor in Urschel's decision.

His retirement as an active player was not the end of his participation in the sport. He was appointed to the College Football Playoff selection committee on January 22, 2020, serving a three-year term which began in the spring of that year.

Mathematics career
While doing his master's at Penn State, Urschel was involved in teaching vector calculus, trigonometry and analytic geometry, and introduction to econometrics. In 2014, Urschel was named Arthur Ashe, Jr. Sports Scholar by Diverse: Issues In Higher Education. In 2015, Urschel co-authored a paper in the Journal of Computational Mathematics titled "A Cascadic Multigrid Algorithm for Computing the Fiedler Vector of Graph Laplacians". It includes "a cascadic multigrid algorithm for fast computation of the Fiedler vector of a graph Laplacian, namely, the eigenvector corresponding to the second smallest eigenvalue."

Urschel began a Ph.D. in mathematics at Massachusetts Institute of Technology (MIT) in 2016, focusing on spectral graph theory, numerical linear algebra, and machine learning. MIT does not allow Ph.D. students to study part-time; while the Ravens knew that he was taking classes, Urschel admitted after retiring from the team that he did not disclose that he was a full-time graduate student, having taken correspondence classes in between games and practices. On January 4, 2017, Urschel was named to Forbes' "30 Under 30" list of outstanding young scientists and owns the following blurb: "Urschel has published six peer-reviewed mathematics papers to date and has three more ready for review. He's won academic awards for his math prowess. All this while playing guard for the Baltimore Ravens."

Since 2017, Urschel has had an Erdős number of 4. His PhD thesis on Graphs, Principal Minors, and Eigenvalue Problems was completed in 2021 under Michel Goemans at MIT. He is a member of the Institute for Advanced Study in Princeton, New Jersey.

Awards and honors 
 2013: Senior CLASS Award
 2016–2018: Dean of Science Fellowship
 2017: Forbes’s "30 Under 30" list in science

Papers 
 Dhruv Rohatgi, John C. Urschel, Jake Wellens. Regarding Two Conjectures on Clique and Biclique Partitions, Preprint, arXiv:2005.02529. 
 John C. Urschel, Uniform Error Estimates for the Lanczos Method, Preprint, arXiv:2003.09362. 
 John C. Urschel, Jake Wellens. Testing k-Planarity is NP-Complete, Information Processing Letters, to appear. 
 Victor-Emmanuel Brunel, Ankur Moitra, Philippe Rigollet, John C. Urschel. Maximum Likelihood Estimation of Determinantal Point Processes, Preprint, arXiv:1701.06501. 
 John C. Urschel, Ludmil T. Zikatanov. Discrete Trace Theorems and Energy Minimizing Spring Embeddings of Planar Graphs, Linear Algebra and its Applications, 2021. 
 John C. Urschel. Nodal Decompositions of Graphs, Linear Algebra and its Applications, Volume 539, 60-71, 2018. 
 John C. Urschel. On the Characterization and Uniqueness of Centroidal Voronoi Tessellations, SIAM Journal on Numerical Analysis, 55(3), 1525-1547, 2017. 
 John C. Urschel, Victor-Emmanuel Brunel, Ankur Moitra, Phillipe Rigollet. Learning Determinantal Point Processes with Moments and Cycles, International Conference on Machine Learning (ICML), 2017. 
 Victor-Emmanuel Brunel, Ankur Moitra, Philippe Rigollet, John Urschel. Rates of Estimation for Determinantal Point Processes, Conference on Learning Theory (COLT), 2017. 
 Xiaozhe Hu, John C. Urschel, Ludmil T. Zikatanov. On the Approximation of Laplacian Eigenvalues in Graph Disaggregation, Linear and Multilinear Algebra, 65(9): 1805-1822, 2017. 
 John C. Urschel, Ludmil T. Zikatanov. On the Maximal Error of Spectral Approximation of Graph Bisection, Linear and Multilinear Algebra, 64(10): 1972-1979, 2016. 
 John C. Urschel, Xiaozhe Hu, Jinchao Xu, Ludmil Zikatanov. A Cascadic Multigrid Algorithm for Computing the Fiedler Vector of Graph Laplacians, Journal of Computational Mathematics, Volume 33 No. 2, 2015, 209-226. 
 John C. Urschel, Ludmil T. Zikatanov. Spectral Bisection of Graphs and Connectedness, Linear Algebra and its Applications, Volume 449, 1-16, 2014. 
 John C. Urschel. A Space-Time Multigrid Method for the Numerical Valuation of Barrier Options, Communications in Mathematical Finance, Volume 2, no. 3, 1-20, 2013. 
 John C. Urschel, Joseph R. Galante. Instabilities in the Sun-Jupiter-Asteroid Three Body Problem, Celestial Mechanics and Dynamical Astronomy, Volume 115, Issue 3, 233–259, 2013

Chess
Urschel competed in the 2015 Pittsburgh Open, finishing in 12th place (tied for 9th) with 3.0 points (+2-1=2) in the Under 1700 rating section. Urschel competes in competitive online chess on Chess.com, and he has commentated for Chess.com's BlitzChamps event, a rapid tournament for NFL players.

Personal life
Urschel is married to writer Louisa Thomas, whom he met when she was profiling him for Grantland. In 2017, their daughter, Joanna, was born. Urschel's autobiography, Mind and Matter: A Life in Math and Football, was co-written by Thomas and published in 2019.

See also
 Frank Ryan – former NFL player and mathematician, who maintained an academic career while playing in the league

References

External links
 
 John Urschel's MIT mathematics website
 
 Penn State biography

1991 births
Living people
21st-century American mathematicians
American football offensive guards
Baltimore Ravens players
Canadian players of American football
College men's track and field athletes in the United States
James E. Sullivan Award recipients
Penn State Nittany Lions football players
Players of American football from Buffalo, New York
Sportspeople from Winnipeg
William V. Campbell Trophy winners
Gridiron football people from Manitoba